Brekovice is a small dispersed settlement south of Žiri in the Upper Carniola region of Slovenia.

Name
Brekovice was attested in written sources as Wreqniz in 1265, Workhobitz in 1453, and Wrekobtzi in 1500.

References

External links

Brekovice on Geopedia

Populated places in the Municipality of Žiri